World class is a superlative that can refer to:

Names 
World class forms part (or all) of the following names:

Sports and Competitions 

 World Class Championship Wrestling
 World class manufacturing
 FAI World Class
 World Class Tag Team Championship
 Drum Corps International World Class Champions
 International World Class Championship Wrestling
 World Class Heavyweight Championship
 World Class Aviation Academy Giants
 U.S. Army World Class Athlete Program

Games 
 World Class Baseball, a video game
 World Class Leaderboard, a golf simulation video game
 World Class Soccer, a 1990 soccer video game
 World Class Track Meet, a sports fitness game
 Graham Gooch World Class Cricket, a video game
 Champions World Class Soccer, a football (soccer) video game
 Bruce Jenner's World Class Decathlon, a 1996 computer game

Miscellaneous 
 World Class is a 1985 album by World Class Wreckin' Cru.
 World Class Wreckin' Cru
 World-Class City
 World Class Rock
 World class standards, in education
 World Class Listening Problem, a 2006 album by Don Caballero
 World Class Cuisine, an American television program
 World Class IT, a 2009 IT management book by Peter A. High
 World-Class Instructional Design and Assessment, an educational consortium of state departments of education
 What It Takes: A Documentary About 4 World Class Triathletes' Quest for Greatness, a documentary film

Superlatives